LG KG800 is the European version of the LG Chocolate, the first product of LG Black Label Series. It is a GSM Tri-Band mobile phone manufactured and sold by LG Electronics. It was released in May 2006 and had its marketing strategy planned and executed  by John Bernard, a marketer based in the UK. The KG800 is a 'slider' style phone that reveals touch sensitive buttons on its face, which activate upon sliding the phone open.

The Chocolate became highly popular and was noted for its fashionable design, low weight (88 grams), and its 1.3-megapixel camera with camcorder. 1.4 million units were sold in its first three months in the European, Asian, and Latin American markets.

LG TG800 (Canada)
A slightly modified version of the KG800, released as the LG TG800, was sold by Rogers Wireless and Fido in Canada, released on the market in November 2006. Additionally, Bell Mobility has a modified version of this phone that works on their CDMA/3G EVDO network despite the offering of the LG Chocolate (VX8500) in Canada available there through Telus Mobility.

See also
LG Chocolate Platinum (KE800)
LG Chocolate (VX8500)
LG Chocolate (VX8550)
LG Chocolate (VX8575)

References

External links 
 LG Hot Chocolate KG800 Review - CNET.com.au

KG800
Mobile phones introduced in 2006